Several ships of the Argentine Navy ( Armada de la República Argentina) have been named Buenos Aires, with or without the prefix "ARA", after the Argentine province of that name.

 , a protected cruiser in service from 1896 to 1932.

Buenos Aires, ARA